The Canterbury-Bankstown Bulldogs are a professional rugby league club in the National Rugby League (NRL), the premier rugby league football competition in Australasia.

Based in Belmore, a suburb of Sydney, the Bulldogs in 1935 were admitted to the New South Wales Rugby League (NSWRL) competition, a predecessor of the current NRL competition.

The Bulldogs won their first premiership in just their fourth season (1938). At the time it made them the quickest club (barring the founding clubs) to win a premiership after admission to the competition, a record which was only recently beaten in 1999 by the Melbourne Storm. They won a second premiership in 1942 but then had to wait another 38 years before breaking through for a third title in 1980. During the 80s, the Bulldogs were a dominant force in the competition appearing in five Grand Finals, 1980, 1984, 1985, 1986 and 1988, winning four of them which was 1980 (18-4 against Eastern Suburbs), 1984 (6-4 against Parramatta Eels), 1985 (7-6 against St. George Dragons) and 1988 (24-12 against Balmain Tigers), only to lose in 1986 (4-2 against Parramatta Eels). In the 90s they featured in the 1994, 1995 and 1998 Grand Finals, winning in 1995 (17-4 against Manly Sea Eagles), but losing in 1994 (36-12 against Canberra Raiders) and in 1998 (38-12 against Brisbane Broncos). Their most recent success was in 2004 when they beat the Sydney Roosters 16-13. The tryscorers were Hazem El Masri and Matt Utai, and the Clive Churchill Medal winner was Willie Mason.

Club Records

Biggest Wins vs Current NRL Clubs

Biggest Losses vs Current NRL Clubs

Biggest Wins vs Former Clubs

Biggest Losses vs Former Clubs

Biggest Comeback
Recovered from a 20-point deficit.
 Trailed Northern Eagles 20-0 after 23 minutes to win 32-30 at NorthPower Stadium on 24 June 2001

Worst Collapse
Surrendered a 20-point lead.
 Led Parramatta Eels 20-0 after 45 minutes to lose 28-20 at ANZ Stadium on 15 March 2008.

Scoring Records
Most Points in a Match
 66 Points, Canterbury beat North Queensland 66-4 (27 August 1995)+

Most Points in a Match (Lose)
 36 Points, Wests Tigers beat Canterbury 37-36 (27 March 2005)

Highest Score Conceded
 91 Points, St George beat Canterbury 91-6 (11 May 1935)^

Most Points in a Season
 342 (16 tries, 139 goals) Hazem El Masri in 2004

Most Tries in a Match
 5, Edgar Newham against Balmain (15 August 1942), Canterbury won 26-20 - NRL
 5, Nigel Vagana against Souths (19 April 2002), Canterbury won 32-6 - NRL

Most Goals in a Match
11, Hazem El Masri against Souths (3 August 2003), Canterbury Won 62-12

^ denotes premiership record

+ denotes club record for biggest win and most points in a match

Streak Records
Longest Winning Streak
 17 Matches, 31 March – 3 August 2002

Longest Losing Streak
 11 Matches, 25 June 1955 – 14 April 1956
 11 Matches, 6 July 1965 – 17 April 1966

Player Records 

Current to Round 25, 2022

Most First Grade Games
317, Hazem El Masri (1996–2009)
273, Steve Mortimer (1976–1988)
262, Terry Lamb (1984–1996)
245, Steve Folkes (1978–1989, 1991)
241, Josh Jackson (2012–2022)
232, Chris Anderson (1971–1984)
225, Luke Patten (2001–2010)
222, Steve Price (1994–2004)
222, Aiden Tolman (2011–2020)
218, Andrew Ryan (2003–2011)

Most Tries For Club
159, Hazem El Masri (1996–2009)
123, Terry Lamb (1984–1996)
103, Josh Morris (2009–2018)
94, Chris Anderson (1971–1984)
82, Luke Patten (2001–2010)
79, Steve Mortimer (1976–1988)
78, Peter Mortimer (1977–1987)
72, Ben Barba (2008–2013)
71, Matt Utai (2002–2009)
63, Steve Gearin (1976–1982, 1985)

Most Goals For Club
891, Hazem El Masri (1996–2009)
630, Daryl Halligan (1994–2000)
405, Steve Gearin (1976–1982, 1985)
375, Terry Lamb (1984–1996)
233, Les Johns (1963–1971)

Most Field Goals For Club
37, Terry Lamb (1984–1996)
19, Les Johns (1963–1971)
11, Trent Hodkinson (2011–2015)
10, Ron Raper (1966–1972)
10, Braith Anasta (2000–2005)

Most Points For Club
2,418 (159 tries, 891 goals), Hazem El Masri (1996–2009)
1,490 (57 tries, 630 goals, 2 field goals), Daryl Halligan (1994–2000)
1,279 (123 tries, 375 goals, 37 field goals), Terry Lamb (1984–1996)
1,006 (63 tries, 405 goals), Steve Gearin (1976–1982, 1985)
545 (14 tries, 233 goals, 19 field goals), Les Johns (1963–1971)
417 (12 tries, 179 goals, 11 field goals), Trent Hodkinson (2011–2015)

Rothmans Medal winners
 Greg Brentnall (1982)
 Terry Lamb (1984)
 Ewan McGrady (1991)

Dally M Medal winners
 Ben Barba (2012)

References

Footnotes
Woods B (2007). El Magic - The Life of Hazem El Masri. Harper Collins Publishing. 
Andrews M (2006). The ABC of Rugby League. ABC Publishing. 
Whiticker A & Hudson G (2005). Canterbury Bulldogs - The Encyclopedia of Rugby League Players. Bas Publishing. 
Whittaker A & Collis I (2004). The History of Rugby League Clubs. 
Lane D (1996). A Family Betrayal - One Man's Super League War - Jarred McCracken. Ironbark Publishing. 
Chesterton R (1996). Good as Gould - Phil Gould's Stormy Life in Football. Ironbark Publishing. 
Lester G (1991). The Bulldog Story.  Publishing. 
Whiticker A (1992). The Terry Lamb Story. Gary Allen Publishing. 
Tasker N (1988). Top-Dog - The Steve Mortimer Story. Century Hutchinson Publishing. 
Lester G (1985). Berries to Bulldogs. Lester - Townsend Publishing. 
NRL Official Information Handbook (2001–2007). Season Guide.
Middleton D (1987–2006). The Official NSWRL, ARL, NRL Yearbook / Annual.
Christensen EE (1946–1977). NSWRL Yearbook.
Rugby League Review (2003–2007).
Big League (1974–2007).
Rugby League Week (1970–2007).
The Rugby League News.

External links
Official Bulldogs Website
Official Bulldogs Team Store
Rugby League Tables - Bulldogs
Back to Belmore - The Official Campaign Website

Records
Sydney-sport-related lists
National Rugby League lists
Australian records
Rugby league records and statistics